is a Japanese manga series written and illustrated by Mitsuteru Yokoyama, based on Eiji Yoshikawa's retelling of the 14th century Chinese literary classic Romance of the Three Kingdoms. It was adapted into an anime television called .

As of May 2020, the manga series had sold over 80 million copies in circulation, making it one of the best-selling manga series of all time.

Characters

Shu Han
 
 
 
 
 

An original character in the manga. She was a daughter of Hong family, who Zhang Fei served. When Liu Bei escaped from the Yellow Turban, he saved her. Meeting Liu Bei and falling in love with him from his younger day, that makes her based on Lady Gan.
  and Kikuko Inoue
An original character in the anime, she was Liu Bei's apprentice who grew up to be his wife. She died of her injuries during the Battle of Changban, this makes her based on Lady Mi.

Cao Wei
 
 
Although his name should be Xiahou Dun (夏侯惇), both the anime and the manga named him Xiahou Chun (夏侯淳).
 
 
  and Michitaka Kobayashi
  and Jun Hazumi
Cao hong

Sun Wu
 
 
 
 
 
  and Kazuo Hayashi

Others
  and Hikaru Midorikawa
 
 
 
 
 
 
 
Narrator

Media

Manga
The manga was first serialized in the Kibō no Tomo magazine, which changed its name to Comic World in 1978, and then to Comic Tom in 1980.

Although Eiji Yoshikawa only wrote the story up to Zhuge Liang's death in the Battle of Wuzhang Plains, the manga continued until the fall of Shu Han.

With this manga, Mitsuteru Yokoyama won the 1991 Japanese Cartoonist Association Award for Excellence.

Anime
The anime was largely faithful to the manga, though it centered mainly on the camps of Liu Bei and Cao Cao, often minimizing the scenes of other camps. The anime stopped after the Battle of Red Cliffs, which is about the midway through the manga series.

Theme songs 
Opening
 by Fence of Defense
"Don't Look Back"  by Fence of Defense
Ending
 by Mimori Yusa
"Standing Alone" by Fence of Defense

Reception 
By May 2020, the manga series had sold over 80 million copies in circulation.

References

External links
 
 

1971 manga
1991 anime television series debuts
Historical anime and manga
Mitsuteru Yokoyama
Works based on Romance of the Three Kingdoms
Shōnen manga

ar:صقور الأرض